Madina Bakbergenova (born 6 January 1996) is a Kazakhstani freestyle wrestler. She is a three-time medalist, including gold, at the Asian Wrestling Championships.

Career 

In the 60 kg event at the 2015 World Wrestling Championships held in Las Vegas, United States, she was eliminated in her first match by Leigh Jaynes of the United States. Jaynes went on to win one of the bronze medals.

In 2016, she won one of the bronze medals in the 60 kg event at the Asian Wrestling Championships in Bangkok, Thailand.

In 2019, she won the silver medal in the 59 kg event at the Asian U23 Wrestling Championship held in Ulaanbaatar, Mongolia. She also won one of the bronze medals in the 65 kg event at the World U23 Wrestling Championship held in Budapest, Hungary. In the same year, she also competed in the 59 kg event at the World Wrestling Championships held in Nur-Sultan, Kazakhstan where she was eliminated in her first match by Pei Xingru of China.

In 2020, at the Golden Grand Prix Ivan Yarygin held in Krasnoyarsk, Russia, she won one of the bronze medals in the women's 59 kg event. In the same year, she also won the bronze medal in the 59 kg event at the Asian Wrestling Championships in New Delhi, India.

In 2022, she competed at the Yasar Dogu Tournament held in Istanbul, Turkey. She won the gold medal in her event at the 2022 Asian Wrestling Championships held in Ulaanbaatar, Mongolia. She won the silver medal in the 68 kg event at the 2021 Islamic Solidarity Games held in Konya, Turkey. She competed in the 68 kg event at the 2022 World Wrestling Championships held in Belgrade, Serbia.

Achievements

References

External links 

 

Living people
1996 births
Place of birth missing (living people)
Kazakhstani female sport wrestlers
Asian Wrestling Championships medalists
21st-century Kazakhstani women